Thirty Two Short Films About Glenn Gould is a 1993 Canadian biographical anthology film about the pianist Glenn Gould, played by Colm Feore. It was directed by François Girard, with a screenplay by Girard and Don McKellar.

The film is presented as a series of 31 short films rather than as one narrative. Segments include documentaries, consisting of interviews with individuals who knew the real Gould, and reenactments of episodes in Gould's life. "Gould Meets McLaren" employs animated spheres from Norman McLaren's filmography. The film received positive reviews and won four Genie Awards, including Best Motion Picture.

Plot
With memories revolving around the family's cottage near Lake Simcoe, Glenn Gould recalls how in his childhood, he had ostensibly made the decision to become a concert pianist at age five. In fact, he believes his mother had already chosen that career for him. He recalls being able to read music before he could read books, and learned the music of Johann Sebastian Bach from his mother. Gould later imagines interviewing himself, in which he confronts himself about why he chose to quit giving concerts at the age of 32, preferring to communicate to his audience through media instead. Gould reminds himself that the musician is inescapably an autocrat, no matter how benign.

In crafting radio documentaries, Gould works on a piece called The Idea of North, which touches on the effects the environment has on the solitude and isolation of the people of Northern Canada. In a media interview, Gould reveals that The Idea of North is one of only five of his documentaries about isolation, and that he intends to make a comedy next because he is tired of serious expression. Interviewers also push him to explain how he could achieve his level of musical perfection without interest in being overly technical in his piano playing. They ask why he insists on being interviewed only over the telephone. Others question if Gould's supposed obsession in technology is merely a smokescreen to keep his distance from real people.

As the markets plummet, Gould picks up word from the bodyguard of the visiting Sheik Yamani to invest in an obscure company called Sotex Resources, which is set to benefit from an exploration contract. Gould becomes the only client to profit in the wake of financial meltdown. However, Margaret Pacsu, a friend, notices Gould's bathroom is stocked heavily with various pills, including Valium, Trifluoperazine and Librax. Gould laughs off the idea that he is taking all of the pills simultaneously, and Pacsu does not notice any effects on his personality. As his birthday approaches, Gould becomes concerned that no one will attend his funeral, despite being aware of strong record sales in Central Europe and Japan. Gould dies at age 50 of a stroke. His cousin, Jessie Greig, says Gould was wrong and his funeral was heavily attended. He had noted Voyager I and Voyager II, space probes launched for possible contact with extraterrestrial intelligence, contains Bach's music as played by Gould.

Segments

 Aria
 Lake Simcoe
 Forty-Five Seconds and a Chair 
 Bruno Monsaingeon: musician and collaborator
 Gould Meets Gould: text by Glenn Gould
 Hamburg
 Variation in c minor
 Practice
 The L.A. Concert
 CD318
 Yehudi Menuhin: violinist
 Passion According to Gould
 Opus 1: a composition by Glenn Gould
 Crossed Paths
 Truck Stop
 The Idea of North: a radio documentary by Glenn Gould
 Solitude
 Questions with No Answers
 A Letter
 Gould Meets McLaren: animation by Norman McLaren
 The Tip
 Personal Ad
 Pills
 Margaret Pacsu: friend
 Diary of One Day
 Motel Wawa
 Forty-Nine
 Jessie Greig: cousin
 Leaving
 Voyager
 Aria
 End Credits

Production

Development

Rhombus Media was established in 1979 with the goal to make a film about pianist Glenn Gould, who was still alive at the time. Producer Niv Fichman explained, "He was our greatest hero. So we thought we would have to make a few short films before we approached Gould to make one about him". After Gould died in 1982, director François Girard mentioned the idea of making a biopic of the pianist in 1990, reviving Fichman's plans.
 
Wishing to have an English Canadian screenwriter, Fichman and Girard proposed the idea to Don McKellar, who had a musical education. McKellar was initially opposed to the idea of adapting Gould's life into a film, calling it "an undramatic life". However, Girard's concept of 32 "short films" intrigued him. McKellar claimed to write the humorous aspects of the screenplay, while Girard was responsible for the trivia. Girard opted to model the screenplay after Bach's Goldberg Variations, which Gould had performed.

Girard found writing challenging, saying, "As Gould was such a complex character, the biggest problem was to find a way to look at his work and deal with his visions. The film is built of fragments, each one trying to capture an aspect of Gould. There is no way of putting Gould in one box. The film gives the viewer 32 impressions of him. I didn't want to reduce him to one dimension." The fact that the concept allowed for 32 segments led to the combination of documentary, fictional and "abstract" scenes, with Girard saying "I allowed myself to play the game to its limits".  The budget was $1.8 million.

Actor Colm Feore watched available video and listened to sound recordings of Gould in order to develop his performance. He also read through 6,000 of Gould's letters.

Filming

Girard took the first shots in Hamburg in August 1992, while Gould's genuine Steinway grand piano was moved to a church in Toronto for principal photography. Most filming took place in Toronto and Montreal. Feore and the filmmakers also shot scenes in Lake Saint Pierre in December 1992, for the scenes set in Northern Canada.

The animation in the "Gould Meets McLaren" segment is clipped from Norman McLaren's film Spheres, published in 1969. Violinist Yehudi Menuhin was among those interviewed for the film.

Music
The soundtrack consists almost entirely of piano recordings by Gould.  It includes pieces famously linked with him, such as Bach: The Goldberg Variations, and the Well-Tempered Clavier. It also features the prelude to Richard Wagner's Tristan und Isolde in the "Lake Simcoe" segment.

Sony Classical released a soundtrack album on CD in 1994. This was part of a strategy to obtain video rights for certain films, with the CD release timed to match the U.S. cinematic release in April.

Release
Thirty Two Short Films About Glenn Gould debuted at the Venice Film Festival in September 1993, where it received positive reviews. It also played at the Toronto International Film Festival in September 1993. In 1994, it was one of 26 films featured in the Miami International Film Festival.

Rhombus Media and Max Films was the Canadian distributor, and after the Toronto festival, made plans for an initial release in Montreal and Toronto. In the U.S., it was distributed by The Samuel Goldwyn Company, and opened in New York City on 14 April 1994.

The Canadian Film Institute restored the film, and in co-operation with TIFF, it was played at Library and Archives Canada in January 2009. A DVD was released in Region 1 in 2012.

Reception

Critical reception
Roger Ebert awarded the film four stars, praising it for parting with the customary biopic format and challenging viewers to imagine themselves as Gould. Janet Maslin of The New York Times assessed it as smart and highly interesting. The Washington Post critic Desson Howe described the segments as exciting and revealing. In Variety, Leonard Klady cited it as a rare film for achieving a picture of both an artist and the artist's work. For Newsweek, David Ansen called it an "elegant, coolly funny movie". The New Republic critic Stanley Kauffmann said it offered "teasing yet satisfactory glimpses- vivid, funny, cranky, passionate, eremitic, humane".

In 2012, The New Yorker'''s Richard Brody wrote the film used unique methods to find Gould's brilliance. In his 2015 Movie Guide, Leonard Maltin gave it two and a half stars, criticizing it as "too fragmented". The film has a 92% rating on Rotten Tomatoes, based on 25 reviews.

 Year-end lists 
 4th – Gene Siskel, The Chicago Tribune 4th – Kenneth Turan, Los Angeles Times 4th – Janet Maslin, The New York Times 6th – Steve Persall, St. Petersburg Times 7th – Scott Schuldt, The Oklahoman 9th – Yardena Arar, Los Angeles Daily News Top 10 (not ranked) – Howie Movshovitz, The Denver Post Honorable mention – Betsy Pickle, Knoxville News-Sentinel Honorable mention – David Elliott, The San Diego Union-Tribune Honorable mention – Robert Denerstein, Rocky Mountain NewsAccolades

Legacy
Girard and McKellar employed a few crew members from Thirty Two Short Films About Glenn Gould for their next film, The Red Violin (1998). Cinematographer Alain Dostie, editor Gaétan Huot and Feore were among those who reunited for the project.

The TV series The Simpsons gave homage to the film with the title of the episode "22 Short Films About Springfield", which aired on 14 April 1996. The A.V. Club asserted many viewers in 1996 would have understood the title, noting the series Animaniacs'' also produced a 1996 short entitled "Ten Short Films About Wakko Warner".

References

External links

1993 films
Best Picture Genie and Canadian Screen Award winners
Canadian anthology films
Canadian musical films
Films about classical music and musicians
Films directed by François Girard
Films set in Toronto
Films shot in Montreal
Films shot in Toronto
Glenn Gould
Musical films based on actual events
The Samuel Goldwyn Company films
English-language Canadian films
1990s Canadian films